Kaesang Pangarep (born 25 December 1994) is an Indonesian entrepreneur and YouTuber. He is the third and youngest son of 7th Indonesian president Joko Widodo. 

He graduated from ACS International in Singapore with an International Baccalaureate diploma, and Singapore University of Social Sciences. He is currently the owner of Liga 1 football club Persis Solo along with Erick Thohir.

Personal life 
Kaesang married Indonesian model Erina Gudono in Yogyakarta, Special Region of Yogyakarta, on 10 December 2022.

Career

Entertainment career 
He became popular as a blogger called 'diary anak kampung' or 'mister kacang' in 2011. His writing style is considered creative and funny, which explores his personal life and his relation with his family. 

Since 2016, Kaesang has been active on YouTube, and many of his videos went viral because of his sense of humor. His YouTube vlogs have become popular; as of May 2017, he has more than 270,000 subscribers. Because of Kaesang's influence, Jokowi created his own YouTube vlog called #JKWVLOG, which gained popularity after posting Jokowi's lunch with King Salman. Kaesang also appeared in the Indonesian television show Mata Najwa to explain his life as the son of Indonesia's president. In 2017, Kaesang released a single song called 'Bersatulah' to promote unity and tolerance among Indonesia's citizens. Kaesang Pangarep made a cameo appearance in the Indonesian movie Cek Toko Sebelah.

Business career 
Kaesang is active in the culinary business, owning a chain of banana-centered outlets operating in several cities in Indonesia. He also created a clothing line, featuring images of tadpoles. In addition, he is active as a marketer in a 2017-launched startup called Madhang, which works with culinary SMEs and households.

Controversies
After creating a video responding to children chanting 'kill Ahok' in a Ramadan Rally, Kaesang was reported to the police for blasphemy and hate speech. However, the police found no evidence of blasphemy and dropped the case.

References

External links 

 

1994 births
Indonesian YouTubers
People from Surakarta
Indonesian Muslims
Living people
Children of national leaders
Javanese people
Joko Widodo
Anglo-Chinese School alumni